The Butcher's Wife is a 1991 American romantic comedy film, directed by Terry Hughes and starring Demi Moore and Jeff Daniels.

The film concerns a clairvoyant woman (Moore) thinks that she's met her future husband, whom she has seen in her dreams, and who is a butcher in New York City. They marry and move to the city, where her powers tend to influence everyone she meets while working in the shop. Through her advice, she helps others and eventually finds the true man of her dreams in a psychiatrist (Daniels).

The Butcher's Wife was a critical and commercial failure, grossing only $9 million at the box office. According to her 2019 memoir Inside Out, Moore regretted starring in the film, saying she only did it to increase her fee after the success of Ghost.

Plot
As a clairvoyant, Marina awaits signs from beyond that her true love, whoever he may be, is waiting for her, somewhere. When New York butcher Leo Lemke shows up on the tiny North Carolina island of Ocracoke, where Marina lives, she is convinced that he is the man predestined to be her husband. After the wedding, Marina moves into Leo's blue-collar neighborhood, where she successfully commiserates with such eccentrics as withdrawn teenager Eugene, frustrated singer Stella Keefover, unlucky-in-love actress Robyn Graves, over analytical psychiatrist Dr. Alex Tremor, and closeted lesbian dress shop clerk Grace. But what Marina fails to grasp about her powers is that she can see the future of strangers far more clearly than her own, and love is unpredictable no matter how many ways you have to look for it.

The film makes use of several phenomena that can be described as occult portents that meeting a love match is imminent or occult tools to help strengthen, seal or bring about love, luck and happiness.  These include the sudden "finding" of a ring that would serve as a wedding band, falling stars with twin tails, zig-zagged rainbows and found objects symbolizing a change in the finder's path that will cause it to cross with their beloved.

Cast
 Demi Moore as Marina Lemke
 Jeff Daniels as Dr. Alex Tremor
 George Dzundza as Leo Lemke
 Mary Steenburgen as Stella Keefover
 Frances McDormand as Grace
 Margaret Colin as Robyn Graves
 Max Perlich as Eugene
 Miriam Margolyes as Gina
 Christopher Durang as Mr. Liddle
 Luis Avalos as Luis
 Helen Hanft as Molly
 Elizabeth Lawrence as Grammy D'Arbo
 Diane Salinger as Trendoid

Reception
On review aggregator website Rotten Tomatoes, the film holds an approval rating of 24%, based on 17 reviews, and an average rating of 4.5/10. Audiences polled by CinemaScore gave the film an average grade of "B" on an A+ to F scale.

Janet Maslin of The New York Times wrote "Too much of the film is spent matching up lovers who must almost literally get their stars uncrossed in order to find happiness. But a lot of it is enjoyably buoyant, even when it's several shades too broad."

Awards and nominations

1991 Golden Raspberry Awards 
One nomination:
 Worst Actress (Demi Moore)

References

External links
 
 
 
 

1991 romantic comedy films
1991 films
American fantasy comedy films
Films set in North Carolina
Films shot in New York (state)
Films shot in North Carolina
Lesbian-related films
Paramount Pictures films
American romantic comedy films
Films directed by Terry Hughes (director)
1990s English-language films
1990s American films